Mount Komochi (子持山, Komochi-yama) is a volcano in Gunma Prefecture, Japan. Its elevation is 4,252 ft (1,296 m) and its prominence is 1,936 ft (590 m).

See also 
 List of mountains in Japan
 List of volcanoes in Japan

References 

Volcanoes of Japan
Mountains of Gunma Prefecture
Volcanoes of Honshū